Hobee's Restaurant is a chain of sit-down restaurants in San Mateo and Santa Clara counties in Northern California, founded in 1974 by Paul Taber.

History 
In 1974, Paul Taber, bought the Dairy Belle restaurant located in the Monta Loma neighborhood of Mountain View, California, and opened the first Hobee's Restaurant. A sometime-vegetarian and animal welfarist, Taber gradually moved the menu away from traditional diner fare Dairy Belle had offered to more alternative options, including tofu, eggs from local farms, freshly baked blueberry coffeecake, and a cinnamon-orange house tea which has become its trademark beverage.

By 2009, Hobee's had grown to twelve locations and grossed over $12 million annually. As of 2023, Hobee's has four operative sites throughout the San Francisco Bay Area, in the Peninsula and South Bay. Historically when a location of Hobee's was closed, their employee's jobs would be transferred to other Hobee's locations so nobody missed work hours.

Hobee's regularly wins the best breakfast and best brunch awards from various Silicon Valley newspapers. In May 2006, Hobee's was named "Best Breakfast/Brunch in Silicon Valley" by The Mercury News.

Locations

Current locations 

 Central Expressway and Rengstorff Avenue, Monta Loma, Mountain View, California
 El Camino Real, Palo Alto, California
 Belmont, California
 Sunnyvale, California

Past locations 

 San Jose, California
 Cupertino, California
 San Bruno, California
 San Luis Obispo, California
 Town and Country Shopping Center, El Camino Real at Embarcadero Road, Palo Alto, California
 Fremont, California

References

External links
 Official website

Restaurants established in 1974
Companies based in Palo Alto, California
Restaurants in the San Francisco Bay Area
Companies based in Mountain View, California